The 1973 Amstel Gold Race was the eighth edition of the annual road bicycle race "Amstel Gold Race", held on Sunday April 7, 1973, in the Dutch provinces of Limburg. The race stretched 238 kilometres, with the start in Heerlen and the finish in Meerssen. There were a total of 165 competitors, and 28 cyclists finished the race.

Result

Further reading

External links

Results

Amstel Gold Race
1973 in road cycling
1973 in Dutch sport